Judy Ann Drama Special is a Philippine anthology drama which aired on ABS-CBN from September 13, 1999 to May 14, 2001, replacing Sa Sandaling Kailangan Mo Ako, and eventually replacemed by Your Honor.

This series is currently streaming on Jeepney TV YouTube Channel.

Cast 

 Judy Ann Santos

Episodes
Bodyguard
Sa Paglaki ni Mommy
Sige,Pakasal Ka Na
Kabit-kabit Na Puso
Ms. Rose Girl
Signos
Sugat sa Ugat
Bihagin ang Babaeng Ito
So What, Coconut?
Santa Claus
A Million and a Baby
Talak, Halakhak, Palakpak
Leap Year Na, Pikot Na
May–December, June–September
Si Nanay at Ako
Wallflower
Chambermaid
Sammy
Alon
Bahay-bahayan
Mental-mentalan
Sa Haplos ng Dilim
Sa Isang Mundo, Sa Dako Roon
Ikaw Lang Sa Aking Pasko
Mangarap Ka Para sa Akin
Idol Ko si Shawie
Taxi Driver, Sweet Lover
Marriage Disposal
Save You, Save Me
Love To the Finish Line
Witchy Witching Hocus Pocus
Kapag Nagunaw Ang Mundo
Sa Pagmulat ng Puso
Pusong Pilak
Work to the Max
Up and Down
One of the Boys
The Brigadier General's Daughter
Mail Order Bride
Bagito
Nightshift
Ms. Dilang Baluktot, Mr. Pusong Haliparot
Guarding Miguelito
Bespren
Guest Of Dishonor
Ugly Duckling
Jack en Joy-lius
Virgin Wife
Lumba-lumba
Wanted: Pregnancy
Si Teray, Si Terry Lobangco
Madaldal ang Puso
Lumapit, Lumayo ang Puso
Boss ni Bess
Siya'y Umalis, Siya'y Dumating
Kidnapped For Love
Ilusyonada
There Goes The Bride
Good Morning, Miss Sungit
Quiere, Quiere Bago Hele
Ghost Singer
Nunal sa Bibig
Romansang ala Pocketbook
Sa Gitna ng Pag-ibig at Paalam
Wanted: Perfect Yaya

See also
List of programs aired by ABS-CBN

References

Philippine anthology television series
1999 Philippine television series debuts
2001 Philippine television series endings
ABS-CBN original programming
1990s Philippine television series
Filipino-language television shows